La Crosse Regional Airport  is a public airport located  northwest of La Crosse, a city in La Crosse County, Wisconsin, United States. Until August 2013 the airport was called La Crosse Municipal Airport.

It occupies the northern area of French Island, next to the Mississippi River. La Crosse's airport is the closest scheduled airline airport to the U.S. Army Fort McCoy base near Sparta, Wisconsin.

The Federal Aviation Administration (FAA) National Plan of Integrated Airport Systems for 2023–2027 categorized it as a non-hub primary commercial service facility. It is the sixth busiest of eight commercial airports in Wisconsin in terms of passengers served.

History
The La Crosse Airport can accommodate the largest aircraft. One of the largest passenger jets, the Boeing 747 Air Force One (AF1), has made overnight trips to this airport with every U.S. President for the last 20 years.

In 1998 President Bill Clinton flew to La Crosse in AF1 Boeing 707 (VC-137C SAM 26000). This was the last time a US President flew on this plane, which was retired to the National Museum of the United States Air Force in Dayton, Ohio. 
One of the world's largest cargo jets, a Russian Antonov An-124, has flown to La Crosse airport. The US military C-5A cargo and KC-10 Extender cargo/refueling jets have been at the annual summer Deke Slayton Airshow (area astronaut), Airfest at the airport, along with vintage and modern military and private planes. The show has also featured the US Navy Blue Angels and the US Air Force Thunderbirds. In the past, Sun Country Airlines has flown DC-10 (380 passenger seats) on charter flights from La Crosse to other cities. The New Orleans Saints NFL football team flew the 180-seat Delta Air Lines Boeing 757 planes each week to La Crosse for summer camp, and to and from NFL cities for pre-season games.

The airport's control tower was one of 143 towers slated for closure by the FAA due to the 2013 federal sequester. However, the closures did not occur after Congress restored funding to the FAA.

Facilities
It has three runways: 18/36 is  concrete; 13/31 is  asphalt; 4/22 is  asphalt.

The original runway layout is still in use, with many improvements. The 8,742-foot paved runway is the fourth longest in Wisconsin, after runways at MKE, MSN and VOK airfields.

The airport has a modern two-story passenger terminal with three gates. The following are provided:
 Delta Air Lines passenger counter and kiosk
 American Airlines passenger counter and kiosk
 Ground Transportation
 Bus service
 Avis
 National Alamo
 Enterprise
 Arrowhead Taphouse and Gifts, 
 Conference rooms

There are 11 corporate hangars and eight multi-aircraft T-hangars on the airport property. There is a cellphone-use free parking area for those awaiting passenger arrivals.

For the 12-month period ending December 31, 2021, the airport had 21,053 aircraft operations, an average of 58 per day: 67% general aviation, 28% air taxi / airline and 5% military. In February 2023, there were 73 aircraft based at this airport: 60 single-engine, 5 multi-engine and 8 jet.

Airlines and destinations

Two major airlines, Delta Air Lines, served by Delta Connection, and American Airlines served by American Eagle, have 3 daily departures and arrivals with direct service to Chicago and Minneapolis. Sun Country Airlines has provided periodic Boeing 737 flights to cities such as Bullhead City, Arizona (next to Laughlin, Nevada).

La Crosse Regional Airport is served by Delta Connection's 50-seat Bombardier CRJ200 and occasionally the newer 76-seat Bombardier CRJ900 or Embraer 175. American Eagle now flies the Embraer 145 and the larger CRJ700s from Chicago.

Passenger

Cargo

Statistics

Number of daily flights

Carrier shares

Top destinations

Annual traffic

See also

 Empire Builder
 La Crosse Municipal Transit Utility
 La Crosse station
 List of airports in Wisconsin
 List of intercity bus stops in Wisconsin
 TCMC (train)

References

External links
 La Crosse Regional Airport, official website
  at the Wisconsin DOT Airport Directory
 Aerial video of La Crosse Regional Airport video at YouTube.com
 
 

Airports in Wisconsin
La Crosse, Wisconsin
Buildings and structures in La Crosse County, Wisconsin